Ali Azam (born 3 August 1972) is a Bangladesh Awami League politician and the incumbent Member of Parliament from Bhola-2.

Career
Azam was elected to parliament on 5 January 2014 as a Bangladesh Awami League candidate.

References

Living people
1972 births
Awami League politicians
10th Jatiya Sangsad members
11th Jatiya Sangsad members